ʻAbd al-Ghafūr (ALA-LC romanization of ) is a male Muslim given name, and, in modern usage, surname, built from the Arabic words ʻabd and al-Ghafūr, one of the names of God in the Qur'an, which give rise to the Muslim theophoric names.

It may refer to:

People

Artists
Reham Abdel Ghafour, Egyptian actress
Sarmad Abdul Ghafoor (born 1975), Pakistani guitarist

Politicians
Abdul Ghafoor Khan Durrani (1910–2000), Pakistani politician
Abdul Ghafoor (politician) (1918–2004), chief minister of Bihar, India
Abdul Ghafoor (Saharsa politician), legislator in Bihar India
Nawabzada Abdul Ghafoor Khan Hoti (1923–1998), Pakistani politician
Abdul Ghafoor Ravan Farhadi, or Ravan A. G. Farhâdi (born 1929), Afghan diplomat
Abdul Ghafor Zori (born 1950), Afghan politician
Barzan Abd Al-Ghafur Sulayman Majid Al-Tikrit, Iraqi politician
Abdul Ghafoor Khan Mayo, Pakistani politician

Sportsmen
Abdul Ghafoor (footballer) (born 1941), Pakistani footballer
Ahmad Abdulghafoor (born 1987), Kuwaiti footballer
Abdul Ghafoor Murad (born 1989), Qatari footballer

Writers
Saleemah Abdul-Ghafur, American writer

Other
Abdul Ghafour (died 2007), Afghan, Taliban commander
Sabi Jahn Abdul Ghafour (died 2004), Afghan, Taliban commander and former Guantanamo detainee (ISN 363)
Abdul Ghafour, Afghan, former Guantanamo detainee (ISN 954)
Abdul Ghafaar, Afghan, former Guantanamo detainee (ISN 1032)

References

Arabic masculine given names